Adács is a village in Heves County,  Northern Hungary Region, Hungary.

The area was inhabited intermittently according to archaeological evidence as early as the Late Bronze Age and was first mentioned in documents from 1323.

Jews lived in Adach in the 18th and 19th centuries.  In 1944, most of the village's Jews were murdered in the Holocaust.

References

Populated places in Heves County